Martijn van der Laan (born 29 July 1988 in Hoogezand) is a Dutch professional footballer who plays as a centre back for SC Genemuiden. He formerly played for BV Veendam and SC Cambuur.

Career
In January 2019 it was confirmed, that van der Laan would join SC Genemuiden from the upcoming 2019–20 season.

References

External links
 Martijn van der Laan at Voetbal International 

1988 births
Living people
People from Hoogezand-Sappemeer
Dutch footballers
Netherlands youth international footballers
FC Groningen players
SC Veendam players
SC Cambuur players
Eredivisie players
Eerste Divisie players
Association football defenders
SC Genemuiden players
Footballers from Groningen (province)